Socorro is a Portuguese-Spanish noun meaning "help" or "relief" (cf. succor). It may also refer to:

Places 

 Socorro, São Paulo, a city in São Paulo state, Brazil
 Socorro (district of São Paulo), a district in São Paulo city, Brazil
 Socorro River, a river in Rio Grande do Sul state in southern Brazil
 Socorro Island, an older name for Guamblin Island, Chile
 Socorro, Santander, a town and municipality in Santander Department, Colombia
 Socorro Province, in the former country of Gran Colombia
 Socorro, Goa, a village in Goa, India
 Socorro Island (Isla Socorro), Mexico
 Socorro, Surigao del Norte, Philippines, a municipality
 Socorro, Oriental Mindoro, Philippines, a municipality
 Socorro, a barangay of Quezon City
 Socorro (Lisbon), a parish in Portugal
 Socorro, New Mexico, a city in the United States
 Socorro County, New Mexico
 Socorro, Texas, a city in the United States
 El Socorro (disambiguation), multiple uses
 Socorro do Piauí, Brazil

People 

 Héctor Socorro (1912–1980), Cuban footballer
 Juan Carlos Socorro (born 1972), Venezuelan footballer
 Socorro Acioli (born 1975), Brazilian author
 Socorro Santiago (born 1951), American actress
 Socorro Tellado Lopez (1927–2009), Spanish author
 Socorro Venegas (born 1972), Mexican writer
 Vilma Socorro Martínez (born 1943), American diplomat

Animals 

 Socorro blenny
 Socorro dove
 Socorro elf owl
 Socorro isopod (Socorro sowbug)
 Socorro mockingbird
 Socorro parakeet
 Socorro springsnail
 Socorro towhee
 Socorro wren

Other uses 

 Socorro (TransMilenio), a mass transit station in Bogotá, Colombia
 Church of Our Lord of Socorro, Ponte de Lima, Portugal
 socorro, a breakpad server written in Python
 Socorro Nobre, a 1995 documentary film
 Socorro Rojo Internacional, International Red Aid
 Socorro Rojo del P.O.U.M., a Spanish aid society during the 1930s civil war
 "Socorro", a song by Brazilian singer Bruno Sutter off his 2015 album Bruno Sutter